Lishui University is a public university located in Lishui, Zhejiang, China. As of fall 2017, the university has one campuses, a combined student body of 13,983 students, 1,126 faculty members, and over 200,000 living alumni.

History
Lishui University traces its origins to the former Chuzhou Normal School, in 1907 and would later become the Zhejiang No. 11 Normal School.

In 1923, Zhejiang No. 11 Normal School and Zhejiang No. 11 High School merged and was divided into secondary school department and teacher education department.

In 1937, the Marco Polo Bridge Incident broke out, the school stopped recruit students.

In 1939, Yingshi University was founded in the site of Lishui Normal School.

In 1946, Chuzhou Normal School was reconstructed in Yunhe County, three years later, the school moved to Lishui.

After the establishment of the Communist State in 1953, it was officially renamed Lishui Normal College.

In August 2000, Zhejiang Minorities Normal College and Songyang Normal College merged into Lishui Normal College.

In March 2003, Lishui Normal College merged with Lishui Vocational and Technical College.

In May 2004, the college was upgraded to an undergraduate university. Lishui Normal College was officially renamed Lishui Normal University, which is still used today.

In March 2007, Lishui Health School was merged into the university.

Schools and Departments

The university consists of 8 colleges, with 45 specialties for undergraduates.

 School of Project and Design
 School of Ecology
 School of Teacher Education
 School of Business
 School of Nationalities
 School of Medical and Health Sciences
 Vocational college
 School of Continuing Education

Culture
 Motto: .  The motto of the school is cited from Great Learning and Book of Rites.
 College newspaper: Lishui University Journal
 Library: the library contains 1,566,900 volumes of paper books, 643,200 volumes of electronic books, 52,800 kinds of electronic periodicals and 35 electronic resources database.

Affiliated schools
 Secondary School attached to Lishui University

References

External links

 

Universities and colleges in Zhejiang
Educational institutions established in 1907
Education in Zhejiang
1907 establishments in China